Booty Call is a series of 33 multiplot Flash animation games created by Julian Max Metter, and originally hosted at Romp.com. In these games the player has to follow the main character, Jake, around and help him on his mission to have sex with various women he sees. Usually the aim is to get him to have sex with one woman; however, a few episodes require more than one to complete.  The series was later adapted into a feature film titled Jake's Booty Call, written and co-directed by Romp.com founder Eric Eisner.

Gameplay

Each episode takes place in different surroundings, and some are easier to complete than others. In the first few episodes, the setting of the game did not change; however, as the series progressed, games gave Jake the ability to choose which setting to go to.

The character of Jake is a Gary Stu for Julian Max Metter (also the producer, writer, director and artist, and voice of Jake). The player controls Jake by using a mouse to click on various buttons to choose actions (such as choosing whether or not to take ecstasy) or dialogue (such as to pretend to be local or a tourist). Jake responds accordingly. If throughout the course of the game, the player chooses the right responses each time, Jake will win and have sex with a girl. The player will be rewarded with a sex scene and the text "You get laid, you big pimp!". In some cases, Jake has sex with more than one girl - in a few episodes, this happens throughout the plot and is referred to as a Bonus Bang; some episodes, notably Hat Trick and It's Your Birthday, require Jake to have sex with more than one girl in order to win. On many occasions the girls were voiced by whomever Julian had met in bars while making the games.

Heterosexual and lesbian sex are the only sexual acts portrayed in the games, although allegedly an animation loop involving Jake being sodomized by his "wingman" was produced and nearly made it into one episode as an Easter egg. If the player makes a mistake, Jake will say something scathing, such as "you have no game", and the player will either be taken back to the previous decision and choose a different path or in some cases restart the episode. Some paths lead the player to the same place and many of the games have a safe point, whence the player can make any decision and end up winning.

The episodes were originally available via the official Romp website (romp.com); however, since it became defunct, a number of websites started to host the episodes. Due to the company Nebulous Films taking on animation following Episode 9, players may notice a large difference in animation quality between the very early episodes and the more recent ones. After their work on Booty Call, some of the Nebulous went on to work for Warner Brothers on their first Flash show, "Mucha Lucha".

Characters

Jake
Jake himself is presented as a brash, boorish, egotistical young man somewhere in his late 20s and loosely based on creator Julian Max Metter. Despite his character, he is also rather charming, especially when it comes to chatting up ladies. He has very low moral standards, indulging heavily in drugs and drinking large amounts of alcohol - his favourite drink is a Jack and Coke. He appears to have the ability to pull drinks and drugs from anywhere in any given situation.

 Jake's choice of clothing is almost always an orange T-shirt and blue jeans, although in some cases this changes (for example, in Wall Street he wears a business suit). In scenes where Jake is unclothed, we see his torso is quite muscular. He has spiky brown hair. He is also the only male character in the series to have his penis censored, mostly by pixelation, objects and occasionally, the "LD" (Long Dilsnic - "Dilsnic" standing for "Dick") logo. The LD is often mentioned throughout the run of episodes. Jake's catchphrase is "Fo' sheezy!", although he has a few other repeated phrases, such as "Laaate," "Once again, it's on!" and "Hells, no!". He deliberately uses these colloquialisms for comic effect. He appears to have a mercurial sense of humour, and laughs a lot.

Jake's surname is never mentioned, he usually gives his name as "Just Jake" or "Jake, Baby" but in the school reunion episode an envelope can be seen with his name on it as "Jake L Koeokd", with a nonsensical postal address in California. Strangely enough the same name and address appears in the top left-hand corner of the envelope implying that he posted his reunion invite to himself.  In the same episode, it is revealed that he left school in 1990.

Others
There are few other recurring characters in the game, due to the fact that most of its characters are girls, and Jake picks a different one every time; however, Jake is sometimes seen with his best friends acting as "wingmen". In many episodes, Calvin accompanies Jake; he is an easy-going young man with blonde hair and sunglasses. In the last few episodes, Dre replaces Calvin; he is slightly younger (he graduates in his first appearance, Graduation Part 1), and smoother than Calvin. He has black hair and a light brown complexion. All main characters appear in the final episode.

Extra webisodes

The three extra webisodes are not games.  One is a music video spoof entitled "Booty Call"; the other two are news reports, reporting on the death of Jake and his subsequent funeral.  These appear to happen out of continuity with the games themselves, as Jake does not publicly die in any episode.

Jake was stabbed to death at the end of the first Mardi Gras episode, but was brought back to life in the second. As Mardi Gras 2 is set immediately afterwards, this happens almost instantly, so there would have been no report on his killing and certainly no funeral.

Film

A feature film, this time fully named Jake's Booty Call, was released, based on the Flash series. The screenplay was written by director Eric Eisner (who co-directed the film with J. Chad Hammes), and voice-acting was provided by Jay Lerner and Julian Max Metter. The film was developed by "Romp Studios", taking the name of the website, and has the curious accolade of being the first film ever to be created entirely in Macromedia Flash with a budget of $50,000. 

The film features Jake befriending Siton Manaba, who is revealed to be a prince looking for love, and trouble ensues as they go travelling together. It is in continuity with the series, and the making of the movie is mentioned at some points through the episodes, although its events never are. At the end of the movie, Jake moves back to his home, so it could feasibly take place at any point in Booty Call'''s canon, the only indication of its point being the appearance of Calvin.

The film was released independently in 2003; however, it was released in the USA only and through selected media, therefore it never went mainstream. National Lampoon picked up the film and took it on tour, showing it mostly at universities around the world. Despite the same themes from the series - drug abuse, alcohol and graphic sexuality (although full-frontal nudity is never seen) - it was rated R by the MPAA, marked as suitable for over 17s.

It was released for DVD in February 2008, five years after its independent release.

Reception
Adweek described Booty Call as employing Animal House'' humour and suggested that the 16-to-25-year-old male target demographic got a rise from the sexual references. The episodes were also met with amusement by the producer's father, Disney CEO Michael Eisner, who crafted the website's "detailed and legalese 'Terms of Use'".

References

External links
 Jake's Booty Call listing on IMDb

Flash games
Erotic video games